Melih Turgut (born 9 July 1997) is a Turkish badminton player. He competed at the 2015 Baku European Games.

Achievements

BWF International Challenge/Series 
Mixed doubles

  BWF International Challenge tournament
  BWF International Series tournament
  BWF Future Series tournament

References

External links 
 

1997 births
Living people
People from Altındağ, Ankara
Sportspeople from Ankara
Turkish male badminton players
Badminton players at the 2015 European Games
European Games competitors for Turkey